Unconditional love is a concept relating to love.

Unconditional love may also refer to:

Film and television
Unconditional Love (2002 film), a 2002 American comedy film directed by P.J. Hogan
Unconditional Love (2003 film), a 2003 British television drama film that aired on ITV

Music

Albums 
 Unconditional Love (Glen Campbell album), 1991
 Unconditional Love (Peabo Bryson album), 1999
 Unconditional Love (Lemonescent album), 2003  
 Unconditional Love (Mai Kuraki album), 2021
 Unconditional Love (Ruben Studdard album), a 2014 album by Ruben Studdard

Songs 
 "Unconditional Love" (Hi-Five song), a 1993 song by Hi-Five
 "Unconditional Love" (Cyndi Lauper song), a 1989 song by Cyndi Lauper
 "Unconditional Love" (Donna Summer song), a 1983 song by Donna Summer
 "Unconditional Love" (Tupac Shakur song), a 1998 song by Tupac Shakur and M.C. Hammer
 "Big Mama (Unconditional Love)", a song by LL Cool J from 10
 "Unconditional Love" (Against Me! song), a 2014 song by Against Me!
 "Unconditional Love" (Plain White T's song), a song by Plain White T's